Outlet Creek is an Eel River tributary draining the Little Lake Valley northerly through a canyon of the California Coast Ranges.  The Northwestern Pacific Railroad bridges the creek twelve times, following it through the canyon.  California State Route 162 bridges the creek once, following the canyon closely downstream of Longvale, California, and U.S. Route 101 bridges the creek twice, paralleling it less closely upstream of Longvale.  After leaving Quaternary alluvium of the Little Lake Valley, the canyon exposes undivided Cretaceous marine sedimentary and metasedimentary rocks upstream of Longvale and Franciscan Assemblage downstream of Longvale. Outlet Creek provides groundwater recharge, recreation, and agricultural and industrial water supply plus wildlife habitat including cold freshwater habitat for fish migration and spawning.

References

See also
List of rivers in California

Rivers of Mendocino County, California
Rivers of Northern California
Tributaries of the Eel River (California)